The Miracle of the Hills is a 1959 American Western film directed by Paul Landres and written by Charles Hoffman. The film stars Rex Reason, Nan Leslie, Betty Lou Gerson, Charles Arnt, Jay North and June Vincent. The film was released on July 29, 1959, by 20th Century Fox.

Plot

A minister arrives at a run-down mining town to take over the church there. He finds he has his work cut out for him, especially when an earthquake causes a flood in the mineshaft and traps some of the local children.

Cast  
 Rex Reason as Scott Macauley
 Nan Leslie as Joanne Tashman
 Betty Lou Gerson as Kate Peacock
 Charles Arnt as Fuzzy
 Jay North as Davey Leonard
 June Vincent as Mrs. Leonard
 Paul Wexler as Sam Jones
 Ken Mayer as Milo Estes
 Kelton Garwood as Seth Jones
 Claire Carleton as Sally
 Tom Daly as Mike
 Tracy Stratford as Laurie Leonard
 Gil Smith as Mark Leonard 
 I. Stanford Jolley as Dr. Tuttle
 Gene Roth as Sheriff Crane
 Gene Collins as Silas Jones

Production
Filming started 17 March 1959. It was June Vincent's film debut.

References

External links 
 

1959 films
20th Century Fox films
American Western (genre) films
1959 Western (genre) films
Films directed by Paul Landres
Films scored by Paul Sawtell
1950s English-language films
1950s American films